The Bihar Legislative Assembly currently have 243 members, each representing a separate electoral constituency.

Bihar Legislative Assembly came into existence in 1937. The Assembly had a strength of 155 members. According to the provisions of the Constitution of India, the first General Elections in the state were held in 1952. The total strength of membership in the Assembly was 331, including one nominated member. Dr. Sri Krishna Singh became the first Leader of the house and the Chief Minister and Dr. Anugrah Narayan Sinha was elected the first deputy leader of the assembly and became state's first Deputy Chief Minister. It was reduced to 318 during the second General Elections. In 1977, the total number of elected members of the Bihar Legislative Assembly was further raised from 318 to 324. With the creation of a separate State of Jharkhand, by an Act of Parliament titled the Bihar Reorganisation Act, 2000, the strength of the Bihar Legislative Assembly was reduced from 325 to 243 members.

Bihar Assembly Constituencies

Legislative Assembly constituencies in Bihar are as follows:

See also
 List of Lok Sabha Constituencies in Bihar
 Elections in India
 None of the Above

Notes

References

External links
Election Commission of India
bihar election result

Bihar
Bihar-related lists